Seguyola is a genus of long-beaked fungus gnats in the family Lygistorrhinidae.

Species
S. variegata  Matile, 1990
S. vicina  Matile, 1990

References

Sciaroidea genera